Andra Akers (September 16, 1943 – March 20, 2002) was an American actress and philanthropist. A character actress, she appeared in films, theater and television, usually in tough or brassy roles.

Early life and education 
Akers was born in New York City. Her father, Anthony B. Akers, was a veteran World War II naval officer and attorney who became the United States ambassador to New Zealand during the Kennedy administration. Her mother, Jane Pope, was the daughter of the architect John Russell Pope. She was descended from William Ellery. Her sister, Ellery Akers, is a poet and naturalist based in Northern California.

Career 
During her time in New Zealand she attended Victoria University of Wellington and appeared in a 1962 production of Chekhov's The Seagull. She continued her studies at Sarah Lawrence College in Yonkers, New York, majoring in theater and political science.

She made her film debut in Brian de Palma's Murder a la Mod in 1968. Her acting career spanned the 1960s through to the mid 1980s, during which time she made several guest appearances in popular television series. In 1986 she retired from acting to found Synergy International, later renamed the Essence Institute, an interdisciplinary think tank involving video and electronic artists, mathematicians, computer scientists and others.

Death 
Akers died in Los Angeles in 2002 following complications from surgery.

Filmography

Film

Television

References

External links
 
 Andra Akers obituary, Los Angeles Times, April 7, 2002

1943 births
2002 deaths
20th-century American actresses
Sarah Lawrence College alumni
American film actresses
American stage actresses
American television actresses
Actresses from New York City